The Butler County Times-Gazette is an American daily newspaper published in El Dorado, Kansas. It is owned by CherryRoad Media after being sold to the company from Gannett in 2021.

The paper covers several communities in northern and eastern Butler County, Kansas, part of the Wichita metropolitan area. In addition to El Dorado, The Times-Gazette coverage area includes Benton, Leon, Potwin, Towanda and Whitewater.

The Times-Gazette was founded in 1919 through the merger of two competing El Dorado dailies, the El Dorado Republican (founded May 5, 1885) and the Walnut Valley Times (founded March 4, 1870, daily since March 1, 1887).

GateHouse Media merged the operations of the Times-Gazette with the Andover American and Augusta Daily Gazette.

The publication was renamed from the El Dorado Times to the Butler County Times-Gazette.

See also
 List of newspapers in Kansas

References

External links
 

Newspapers published in Kansas
Butler County, Kansas
Mass media in Wichita, Kansas
Newspapers established in 1919
El Dorado, Kansas